Leoš Friedl (born 1 January 1977) is a retired Czech tennis player.

Friedl's career-high ATP doubles ranking was No. 14, achieved on 8 August 2005. He often partnered in doubles with František Čermák. His career-high ATP singles ranking was No. 353, achieved on 13 November 2000.

In his career, he won 16 ATP Tour doubles titles and the 2001 Wimbledon mixed-doubles title with Daniela Hantuchová, where they beat Mike Bryan and Liezel Huber, 4–6, 6–3, 6–2.

Friedl coached Karolína Plíšková from July to December 2022.

Significant finals

Mixed doubles: 1 (1 title)

ATP career finals

Doubles: 32 (16 titles, 16 runner-ups)

ATP Challenger and ITF Futures Finals

Singles: 1 (0–1)

Doubles: 34 (16–18)

Performance timelines

Doubles

Mixed doubles

References

External links
 
 
 

Czech male tennis players
People from Jindřichův Hradec
Wimbledon champions
Living people
1977 births
Grand Slam (tennis) champions in mixed doubles
Sportspeople from the South Bohemian Region
Czech tennis coaches